Pezotettiginae is a subfamily of grasshoppers in the family Acrididae, found in southern Europe, northern Africa, and the Mediterranean region. There are about 10 described species in Pezotettiginae.

Genera
These genera belong to the subfamily Pezotettiginae:
 Pezotettix Burmeister, 1840
 Sphenophyma Uvarov, 1934 - monotypic S. rugulosa (Stål, 1876)

References

Further reading

 

Acrididae
Orthoptera subfamilies